Lawrence Kitchin Kerr (25 June 1928 – 28 December 2001) was an Australian rules footballer who played with Carlton in the VFL during the 1950s. He was named as an emergency in Carlton's official 'Team of the Century'.

Kerr was educated at St Kevin's College in Toorak.

Kerr had exceptional pace and played in either as a winger, centreman or half-forward flanker. Prior to his recruitment by the Blues he was a Victorian schoolboy sprint champion.

His grandson, Pat Kerr, was drafted by Carlton with pick number 65 in the 2016 national draft.

References

External links

1928 births
Australian rules footballers from Victoria (Australia)
Carlton Football Club players
People educated at St Kevin's College, Melbourne
2001 deaths